Abida is a feminine given name. The masculine version of the name is Abid. It means the one who worships. Notable people with the name include:
Abida (biblical figure), biblical figure and son of Midian
Abida Mia, Malawian politician
Abida Parveen (born 1954), Pakistani Sufi singer
Abida Sultan (1913–2002), Indian princess
Abedah-Kristin Ritchie (born 1986), American rapper known as MC Router
Syeda Abida Hussain (born 1948), Pakistani politician

Feminine given names